Barron is a suburb of Cairns in the Cairns Region, Queensland, Australia. In the  Barron had a population of 42 people.

Geography 
Although Barron has been a suburb of Cairns rather than a locality since 2002, as at 2021, the principal land use is farming with little residential development.

The locality is bounded to the north-east by the Captain Cook Highway and in the other directions by Kamerunga Road (approximately). The Tablelands railway line also forms the southern boundary with Freshwater railway station serving the suburb.

The Barron River enters the suburb from the south-west (Kamerunga) as does Freshwater Creek (formerly the Davidson River) with their confluence on the western boundary of the suburb. The river then flows towards the north of the suburb and then to the south-east (along the boundary with Stratford), finally exiting to the east (Machans Beach).

The land is flat and low-lying (less than 10 metres above sea level). The main crop is sugarcane and a network of cane tramways pass through the suburb to deliver the harvested sugarcane to the Mulgrave Sugar Mill in Gordonvale.

History
In the  Barron had a population of 42 people.

Education 
There are no schools in Barron. The nearest government primary schools are Caravonica State School in neighbouring Caravonica to the west, Machans Beach State School in neighbouring Machans Beach to the east, and Freshwater State School in neighbouring Freshwater to the south. The nearest government secondary schools are Smithfield State High School in Smithfield to the north-west, Redlynch State College in Redlynch to the south-west, and Cairns State High School in Cairns North to the south-east.

Amenities 

The Bunny Adair Park on Lower Freshwater Road (once in Freshwater but now in Barron) is named after politician and Freshwater Hotel publican, Bunny Adair. The park has equestrian facilities and is home to the Freshwater Pony Club.

Attractions 

Freshwater railway station  is a popular departure point for the Kuranda Scenic Railway with free parking, a restored historic railway station building, restaurant in heritage railway carriages, and a theatrette. The station is on Kumerunga Road near the junction with Old Smithfield Road.

References

External links